For the 1961 Vuelta a España, the field consisted of 100 riders; 50 finished the race.

By rider

By nationality

References

1961 Vuelta a España
1961